A list of the films produced in Mexico in 1941 (see 1941 in film):

1941

External links

1941
Films
Lists of 1941 films by country or language